Viron Transportation Company or Viron Transit is a bus company servicing the Ilocos Region, Philippines. The bus company is owned by millionaire Santiago Rondaris' daughter. It formerly operated as far as the second district of Ilocos Sur but has started to operate as far as Laoag City after the collapse of its related bus company Times Transit.

History 
Viron Transportation Co., Inc. ("Viron" originates from "VIRgilio RONdaris") is related to the former Times Transit (because it is owned by their father Santiago Rondaris).  It once used Superior Coach-bodied International Harvester Loadstar and early S-Series—essentially the same specs as those of Times Transit but with different livery: cream with green and red stripes and green-colored fonts; plus rims painted red with green borders plus illuminated logo on the roof. They also operated Hino buses with "Bustler" bodies built under license from UK coachbuilders Plaxton by Manila Motor Works. Nowadays it is using and mostly relying on its newer rebodied Mitsubishi Fuso, Hino RF, Mercedes Benz and King Long buses.  Their Loadstar and S-Series coaches were stored at Pozorrubio, Pangasinan, in front of Dominion Bus Line's Terminal (owned by his sister Virginia Rondaris-Mendoza); and were recently sold to a collector for about PhP60,000 per bus.

Once only limited to the second district of Ilocos Sur. It has expanded to the first district of the province and beyond; and has occupied the former Times Transit compound in Vigan (near the ISECO Vigan Sub-Office, behind Mira Hills) after Times' collapse, and serves as its terminal there.  It has also stop-over terminals/garages in San Fernando, La Union and Narvacan, Ilocos Sur.  Starting May 20, 2013, Viron Transit will be using the front of the terminal formerly used by Times located along Quezon Avenue in Vigan, with the existing Dominion Bus Lines terminal (which is a former garage for Times buses) located at the back.

Fleet
Viron Transit is utilizing Mitsubishi Fuso, Hino Pilipinas, Mercedes Benz, King Long buses, Viron Motor/Marilao Works (VMW) at present, totalling 120 units (including those from Dominion Bus Lines).

 PRESENT FLEETS
Hino Pilipinas
Hino Rk
Hino Partex
King Long 
XMQ6110Y 
XMQ6118CB 
XMQ6802Y2 (Used for Charter /Tourist)  
XMQ6117Y3 
XMQ6101Y (1 Super Deluxe Regular Fare)
Viron Motors/Marilao Works (VMW)
FORMER FLEETS
Mitsubishi Fuso
Mercedes Benz

Destinations 
Metro Manila
Cubao, Quezon City
Sampaloc, Manila
 Provincial Destinations
Bangued, Abra
Candon, Ilocos Sur
Narvacan, Ilocos Sur
Vigan City, Ilocos Sur
Laoag City, Ilocos Norte
San Fernando City, La Union
Pozorrubio, Pangasinan
Tayug, Pangasinan 
San Nicolas, Pangasinan via Tayug
Asingan, Pangasinan
Umingan, Pangasinan
San Jose, Nueva Ecija

Note: All Viron Transit Buses were pass through SCTEX Concepcion Exit starting last April 2017, and then in 2018, some of buses were pass through TPLEX Uradenta or Pozorrubio Exit.

Former Destinations

Lingayen, Pangasinan
Manaoag, Pangasinan

References 
 http://lawphil.net/judjuris/juri2007/aug2007/gr_170656_2007.html
 http://sc.judiciary.gov.ph/jurisprudence/2003/apr2003/117020.htm
 http://www.chanrobles.com/scdecisions/jurisprudence2000/nov2000/138296.php
 http://www.lawphil.net/judjuris/juri1998/jul1998/gr_125034_1998.html

External links 

 http://www.virontransit.redpages.ph/
Five Star Bus Company

Bus companies of the Philippines
Companies based in Manila
Transport companies established in 1978

ko:빅토리 라이너